Zeoform is a material developed and patented by the Australian company Zeo IP Pty. It is derived from water and cellulose, specifically polymeric lignocellulosic fibres from industrial biomass into a structural material suitable for various applications in the industrial sector. It is claimed to be non-toxic, biodegradable, and that it could replace many forms of hard plastics and synthetic and chemical composites.

History
The original discovery of its basis occurred in 1897 by a German company M.M.Rotten in Berlin, patenting a method to produce a natural material utilizing cellulose. Almost 100 years later, three material researchers made advancements on the process that is the basis for Zeoform. This led to the creation, in 2005, of an Australian company that manufactured Artesanal products from the material. In 2008 Alf Wheeler, an Australian entrepreneur and businessman, joined the company as CEO and changed the focus from a “product” company to a “raw materials” company. Zeo IP Pty Ltd and then established in 2009 to protect and proliferate the material and the brand worldwide.

Production
Zeoform is derived from lignocellulosic biomass, such as hemp, cotton, bamboo, sisal, jute, palm, coconut and other cellulose feedstock. It is made without any glues, binders, chemicals or synthetics. The fundamental chemistry (and patented formula) causes a fibrillation (feathering) of cellulose micro-fibres (in water), then physical ‘entanglement’ and hydroxyl bonding through evaporation. Done correctly, it results in a super-strong, highly durable, consistent material that emulates wood & wood composites, resin composites, fibreglass and many hard plastics. Zeoform can be produced with various qualities – from light styrofoam to dense ebony. The material is sustainable, compostable and sequesters carbon.

Applications
Zeoform can be used as a replacement for conventional materials in hundreds of industries, including construction grade flat sheets and curved panels to replace MDF, Masonite, Formica, Corian and other synthetic composites. Zeoform can be sprayed, molded, pressed, laminated or formed using manual and mechanical processes. It can be produced in quantities ranging from small cottage industry to fully automated and robotic mass production.

See also

Biodegradable plastic

References

Composite materials